The Indiana Authors Awards, also known as the Eugene and Marilyn Glick Indiana Authors Awards, is a literary awards program that recognizes and honors authors from Indiana and literary works about Indiana. In 2020, awards were given in eight categories, including fiction, nonfiction, poetry, children’s literature, young adult literature, drama, genre and emerging. The awards program runs biennially, with books published in 2020 and 2021 honored in 2022. Winners receive a cash prize, an Indiana limestone award trophy, and the opportunity to select an Indiana library to receive a donation.

History
The awards program was founded in 2009 by philanthropists Eugene and Marilyn Glick, partnering with The Indianapolis Public Library Foundation to create a program which recognized authors annually. Honors were awarded to authors in the three main categories of national, regional, and emerging, with some years including recognition for lifetime achievement and general excellence.

In 2018, Glick Philanthropies announced a desire to expand the awards program. After a year hiatus, in 2019 Glick Philanthropies partnered with Indiana Humanities to offer an expanded program, awarding honors to books every other year and a new Literary Champion Award. The 2020 awards included books in eight categories and recognized the Indiana Writers Center as Literary Champion. In the spring of 2022, the Indiana Authors Awards Tour will bring recent award-winning authors to Indiana communities.

Winners of awards for lifetime bodies of work
Following is a subset of the awards granted, focusing just on top honors that are for authors' complete lifetime works.  These primarily are just the National Winners, the Regional Winners, and the Lifetime Achievement Awards which were all granted on basis of persons' entire body of works.  It omits two National Finalist and four Regional Finalist awards given in 2009-10, the first years of the program, and not offered in any later year. It includes two "Excellence" awards given, and it omits "Emerging Winner" and "Emerging Finalist" awards.  In 2019, no awards were granted, and the focus of the program shifted to make awards for recent books in various categories (therefore not for entire bodies of work).  No awards were given in 2021.  In 2020 and 2022, there appears to be only one "Lifetime Achievement" award granted, included below.  All the other awards were for best recent book in various categories (Children's, Drama, Young Adult, Middle Grade, Fiction, Nonfiction) and are not included below.

The remaining 26 awards through 2022 make up a set of authors comparable to other writers' halls of fame.  These awards, for entire bodies of authors' complete work, are:

Notes

References 

Writers halls of fame
American literary awards
2009 establishments in Indiana